Great Crimes and Trials (sometimes titled Great Crimes and Trials of the Twentieth Century) is a 1993–1996 BBC documentary television series. The program uses archival material to reconstruct a renowned crime, examining the felon's motives, details of the crime, the investigations and the trial. Each episode is narrated by actor Robert Powell.

Series 1 (1993)

Series 2 (1994)

Series 3 (1996)

Broadcasting
The series was originally broadcast on Tuesday afternoons on BBC2 in the United Kingdom and in the United States on the A&E Network. In the mid-late 2000s the program was repeated on weekdays in the United Kingdom on the Crime & Investigation Network. The broadcast of the series began on Russian TV-6 channel in the fall 2000.

The 2011 series
In 2011 the Investigation Discovery rebooted the series narrated by Alisdair Simpson, with infamous cases from the late 20th century and the early 21st century. The series aired one season with 26 episodes.

Great Crimes and Trials (2011)

Book

A book to accompany the series was published by Carlton Books in late 1993 written by Paul Begg and Martin Fido. Comprising twenty eight true crime cases, the book profiles twenty five of those from series one (including The Hammersmith Murders), one case which would later be profiled in series three (Bentley and Craig) and two that were never featured on the programme (The Krays and The Moors Murders).

Home Media
Several collections of Great Crimes and Trials have been released to VHS and DVD. The first and second series were released on video by Columbia Tristar in 1997. The first series was released on DVD by Columbia Tristar in 2005, and the third series was released on DVD by Network DVD in 2011.

In the US, two collections were released by Sony as part of the "Sony Choice Collection" line of burn-on-demand DVD-R's in 2013. Great Crimes And Trials of the 20th Century, Volume 1: Gruesome California features six episodes on one disc of crimes that took place in California and Great Crimes And Trials of the 20th Century, Volume 2: The Original Gangstas features five mob and gangster related episodes on one disc.

References

Cited works and further reading

External links

Crime & Investigation Network listing Archived from the original on 20 August 2007.
IMDb

1990s British documentary television series
1993 British television series debuts
1996 British television series endings
BBC television documentaries
British crime television series
British television documentaries
English-language television shows